Sensors are devices that measure physical quantities and convert them into signals which can be read by observers or by instruments. 

Sensors may also refer to:
 Sensors (album), a 2007 progressive rock album
 Sensors (journal), a Swiss open access journal
 sysctl hw.sensors, an OpenBSD framework for hardware monitoring sensors
 lm_sensors, a Linux software for hardware monitoring sensors
Image sensor, as used in digital cameras, camera modules, medical imaging equipment, night vision equipment such as thermal imaging devices, radar, sonar, and others

See also
 List of sensors
 Sensor (disambiguation)